Robert Paul Giallombardo (born May 20, 1937) was a pitcher in Major League Baseball. He pitched in six games for the Los Angeles Dodgers during the 1958 baseball season.

External links

Major League Baseball pitchers
Los Angeles Dodgers players
1937 births
Living people
Hornell Dodgers players
Reno Silver Sox players
Montreal Royals players
Spokane Indians players
Greenville Spinners players
Sportspeople from Brooklyn
Baseball players from New York City